The Russian occupation of Zhytomyr Oblast was a military occupation that began on 26 February 2022, 2 days after Russia invaded Ukraine. The capital, Zhytomyr was never captured and was bombed in the 2022 Zhytomyr attacks. Small towns and settlements were however captured, in the north-west and north-central Korosten Raion, near the border with Kyiv Oblast.

Occupation 
Russian forces advanced from Gomel Oblast, Belarus into Zhytomyr Oblast, at first capturing several settlements such as Pershotravneve, Vystupovychi [uk]  and Radcha [uk]. More troops later arrived in north-central Zhytomyr Oblast, and captured Chervonosilka [uk],Selezivka [uk] and Syrnytsia [uk]. At its greatest extent, the occupation was 1421.16 km2 (548.71 mi2). 

On 5 March, Russian forces took control of Kocheriv [uk] and Kvitneve [uk].

On 31 March, Ukrainian forces retook Selezivka and Syrnystia, Kocheriv and Kvitene. leaving only Chervonosilka, Pershotravneve, Radcha and several other small villages under Russian control.

By 2 April, Ukrainian officials claimed to have cleared the region of Russian forces. Zhytomyr Oblast governor Vitaliy Buchenko claimed that Russian troops left military equipment and mines in towns and homes.

On 8 April, Russia withdrew from the entirety of its occupied territories in northern Ukraine.

Control of cities

See also 

 Russian-occupied territories of Ukraine
 Russian occupation of Crimea
 Russian occupation of Chernihiv Oblast
 Russian occupation of Donetsk Oblast
 Russian occupation of Kharkiv Oblast
 Russian occupation of Kherson Oblast
 Russian occupation of Kyiv Oblast
 Russian occupation of Luhansk Oblast
 Russian occupation of Mykolaiv Oblast
 Russian occupation of Sumy Oblast
 Russian occupation of Zaporizhzhia Oblast
 Snake Island during the 2022 Russian invasion of Ukraine
 Annexation of Crimea by the Russian Federation
 Russian annexation of Donetsk, Kherson, Luhansk and Zaporizhzhia oblasts

References 

Zhytomyr
February 2022 events in Ukraine
March 2022 events in Ukraine
April 2022 events in Ukraine
History of Zhytomyr Oblast